Thomas Linke (born 26 December 1969) is a retired German professional footballer. He played as a central defender an last worked as the director of football of FC Ingolstadt 04. 

Linke was remembered as a hard-nosed tackler with tremendous heading ability, and played in 13 Bundesliga seasons in representation of Schalke 04 and Bayern Munich, totalling 340 games. Having gained his first cap for Germany in his late 20s, Linke went on to represent the nation in one World Cup and one European Championship.

Club career

Early years / Schalke

Born in Sömmerda, Bezirk Erfurt, East Germany, Linke began playing football in 1977 with local BSG Robotron Sömmerda. In 1983, he transferred to FC Rot-Weiß Erfurt, eventually making the breakthrough into the first team in 1989; with the latter, he had the opportunity to gain experience by playing in the DDR-Oberliga.

After finishing third in the last year of the competition, the club was placed into the newly consolidated 2. Bundesliga in 1991, as part of the German reunification process. Linke was a starter throughout the season but was ultimately unable to prevent it from being relegated, while also appearing in four games in the UEFA Cup.

During Rot-Weiß Erfurt's German Cup win over FC Schalke 04, the latter team's management took notice of Linke and signed him for the following campaign. He quickly earned his way into the starting line-up and, from 1992 until 1998, appeared in a total of 175 Bundesliga games for the Royal Blues, his debut coming on 1 September 1992 in a 0–0 home draw against SV Werder Bremen.

Linke's crowning achievement during his tenure with Schalke was the penalty shootout win over Inter Milan, in the 1996–97 UEFA Cup. He appeared in 11 matches during the victorious run, scoring twice.

Bayern Munich
In 1998, Linke joined national giants FC Bayern Munich, where he would go on to experience the most successful chapter of his professional career. In his first season, he scored his first goal for the Bavarians in a 3–1 derby home win over TSV 1860 München on 7 November, but would also start in the notorious UEFA Champions League final against Manchester United.

With Bayern, Linke won five leagues, three German Cups and four league cups, in addition to the 2001 editions of the Champions League and the Intercontinental Cup. In the final of the former, he scored the final penalty to give his team the victory in the shootout against Valencia CF.

Since first joining Bayern, numerous critics prophesied that Linke would never be able to hold on to his starting spot in the center of defense. The player made it a point to prove his critics wrong by continually impressing with solid, if unspectacular, performances. Not until his last year, under coach Felix Magath, did he end up losing his starting role to Croatian Robert Kovač, appearing in only 11 games but helping in another league conquest.

Red Bull Salzburg
At the beginning of 2005–06, 35-year-old Linke made the decision to extend his playing career by transferring to the Austrian Bundesliga, linking up with newly re-tooled FC Red Bull Salzburg alongside former Bayern teammate Alexander Zickler. Soon after arriving, he was appointed team captain, and became a regular fixture. During his second season, he added one last piece of silverware to his extensive collection by winning the league; on 3 May 2007, the club informed him that his initial two-year contract would not be extended.

On 13 June 2007, aged almost 38, Linke agreed to a Bayern return, linking with the club's amateur side in the third division. In early 2008, he re-joined Salzburg, serving as assistant to director of football Heinz Hochhauser and subsequently retiring from playing.

International career
Linke's debut with the Germany national side took place in a 3–0 victory over South Africa, on 15 November 1997. He represented the nation at UEFA Euro 2000 and the 2002 FIFA World Cup.

In the latter competition, Linke played a key role in the team that would eventually finish runner-up after a 0–2 loss in the final to Brazil. Additionally, he scored his only international goal during the group stage match against Saudi Arabia, an 8–0 routing.

Linke announced his international retirement after that tournament, but was called up for national duty once more in 2004. After numerous injuries to the defensive line, national coach Jürgen Klinsmann personally called the player on the telephone and asked him to temporarily come out of retirement. He appeared, being booked, in a 3–1 friendly win in Austria on 18 August 2004, and retired immediately after, with 43 caps to his name.

Career statistics

Club

International

Scores and results table. Germany's goal tally first:

Honours
Schalke 04
UEFA Cup: 1996–97

Bayern Munich
Bundesliga: 1998–99, 1999–2000, 2000–01, 2002–03, 2004–05
DFB-Pokal: 1999–2000, 2002–03, 2004–05; runner-up: 1998–99
DFB-Ligapokal: 1998, 1999, 2000, 2004
UEFA Champions League: 2000–01; runner-up: 1998–99
Intercontinental Cup: 2001
UEFA Super Cup runner-up: 2001

Red Bull Salzburg
Austrian Bundesliga: 2006–07

Germany
FIFA World Cup: runner-up 2002

References

External links

1969 births
Living people
People from Sömmerda
People from Bezirk Erfurt
German footballers
East German footballers
Footballers from Thuringia
Association football defenders
Bundesliga players
2. Bundesliga players
FC Rot-Weiß Erfurt players
FC Schalke 04 players
FC Bayern Munich footballers
FC Bayern Munich II players
Austrian Football Bundesliga players
FC Red Bull Salzburg players
Germany international footballers
1999 FIFA Confederations Cup players
UEFA Euro 2000 players
2002 FIFA World Cup players
German expatriate footballers
Expatriate footballers in Austria
German expatriate sportspeople in Austria
UEFA Champions League winning players
UEFA Cup winning players